Elections were held on November 2, 2010, to determine Missouri's nine members of the United States House of Representatives. Representatives were elected for two-year terms to serve in the 112th Congress from January 3, 2011 until January 3, 2013. Primary elections were held on August 3, 2010.

Of the nine elections, the races in the 3rd and 4th districts were rated as competitive by The Cook Political Report, CQ Politics, The Rothenberg Political Report and Sabato's Crystal Ball. Seven of Missouri's nine incumbents were re-elected, while one (Ike Skelton of the 4th district) unsuccessfully sought re-election and one (Roy Blunt of the 7th district) did not seek re-election.

In total, six Republicans and three Democrats were elected. A total of 1,920,675 votes were cast, of which 1,103,290 (57.44 percent) were for Republican candidates, 708,064 (36.87 percent) were for Democratic candidates, 92,485 (4.81 percent) were for Libertarian Party candidates, 8,759 (0.46 percent) were for Constitution Party candidates, 7,193 (0.37 percent) were for an independent candidate and 884 (0.05 percent) were for write-in candidates.

Overview
Results of the 2010 United States House of Representatives elections in Missouri by district:

District 1

 
The 1st district included Ferguson, Florissant, Hazelwood, Spanish Lake, and parts of St. Louis and University City. The district's population was 54 percent black and 40 percent white (see Race and ethnicity in the United States Census); 83 percent were high school graduates and 24 percent had received a bachelor's degree or higher. Its median income was $41,404. In the 2008 presidential election the district gave 80 percent of its vote to Democratic nominee Barack Obama and 19 percent to Republican nominee John McCain.

Democrat William Lacy Clay, Jr., who took office in 2001, was the incumbent. Clay was re-elected in 2008 with 87 percent of the vote. In 2010 Clay's opponent in the general election was Republican nominee Robyn Hamlin, an insurance agent. Libertarian Party nominee Julie Stone also ran. Candice Britton also sought the Democratic nomination. Martin Baker and Marshall Works also sought the Republican nomination. Robb Cunningham also sought the Libertarian nomination.

Clay raised $693,370 and spent $635,944. Hamlin raised $23,930 and spent $24,012. Britton raised $1,813 and spent $2,026.

Prior to the election FiveThirtyEights forecast gave Clay a 100 percent chance of winning and projected that he would receive 74 percent of the vote to Hamlin's 23 percent. On election day Clay was re-elected with 74 percent of the vote to Hamlin's 24 percent. Clay was re-elected in 2012, again over Hamlin, and in 2014.

Democratic primary results

 
 
 
 

Republican primary results

 
 
 
 
 

Libertarian primary results

 
 
 
 

General election results

 
 
 
 
 

External links
 
 
 
 

District 2

 
The 2nd district included Ballwin, Chesterfield, St. Charles, Wildwood and parts of O'Fallon, St. Peters and Wentzville. The district's population was 91 percent white (see Race and ethnicity in the United States); 93 percent were high school graduates and 42 percent had received a bachelor's degree or higher. Its median income was $73,641. In the 2008 presidential election the district gave 55 percent of its vote to Republican nominee John McCain and 44 percent to Democratic nominee Barack Obama.

Republican Todd Akin, who took office in 2001, was the incumbent. Akin was re-elected in 2008 with 62 percent of the vote. In 2010 Akin's opponent in the general election was Democratic nominee Arthur Lieber, the co-founder of the Crossroads College Preparatory School. Libertarian Party nominee Steve Mosbacher also ran. Bill Haas and Jeffrey Lowe also sought the Republican nomination. Liz Lauber, a government and industry relations communications consultant for Wells Fargo, ended her campaign for the Republican nomination in April 2010. Lieber was unopposed for the Democratic nomination.

Akin raised $767,798 and spent $825,668. Lieber raised $50,504 and spent $49,234. Haas raised $33,372 and spent $13,449. Lauber raised $6,724 and spent the same amount.

Prior to the election FiveThirtyEights forecast gave Akin a 100 percent chance of winning, and projected that he would receive 68 percent of the vote to Lieber's 29 percent. On election day Akin was re-elected with 68 percent of the vote to Lieber's 29 percent. In 2011 Lieber wrote and published a book about his campaign entitled An Unlikely Candidate: Reflections on My Run for Office. Akin unsuccessfully ran for the U.S. Senate in 2012. He was succeeded by Republican Ann Wagner.

Republican primary results

 
 
 
 
 

General election results

 
 
 
 
 
 

 Further reading 
 

External links
 
 

District 3

The 3rd district included Oakville and part of St. Louis. The district's population was 85 percent white and 9 percent black (see Race and ethnicity in the United States); 86 percent were high school graduates and 27 percent had received a bachelor's degree or higher. Its median income was $51,192. In the 2008 presidential election the district gave 60 percent of its vote to Democratic nominee Barack Obama and 39 percent to Republican nominee John McCain. In 2010 the district had a Cook Partisan Voting Index of D+7.

Democrat Russ Carnahan, who took office in 2005, was the incumbent. Carnahan was re-elected in 2008 with 66 percent of the vote. In 2010 Carnahan's opponent in the general election was Republican nominee Ed Martin, a former chief of staff to Governor of Missouri Matt Blunt. Constitution Party nominee Nick Ivanovich and Libertarian Party nominee Steven Hedrick also ran. David Arnold and Edward Crim also sought the Democratic nomination. John Wayne Tucker and Rusty Wallace, a computer-aided design technician, also sought the Republican nomination.

Carnahan raised $2,127,173 and spent $2,276,619. Martin raised $1,539,980 and spent $1,514,663. Arnold raised $907 and spent $904. Tucker raised $9,125 and spent $9,124.

A poll of 400 likely voters, conducted by Ayres, McHenry & Associates on August 16, 17 and 20, 2010, found Carnahan leading with 54 percent to Martin's 38 percent, while 8 percent were undecided. In a poll of 1,089 registered voters, conducted on August 17, 2010 by We Ask America, found Carnahan leading with 48 percent to Martin's 39 percent, while 13 percent were undecided. Sabato's Crystal Ball rated the race as "Likely Democratic". In October 2010, The Cook Political Report rated the race as "Lean Democratic" and CQ Politics rated the race as "Likely Democratic". In November 2010 The Rothenberg Political Report rated the race as "Democrat Favored". Prior to the election FiveThirtyEights forecast gave Carnahan a 96 percent chance of winning and projected that he would receive 55 percent of the vote to Martin's 43 percent.

On election day Carnahan was re-elected with 49 percent of the vote to Martin's 47 percent. Martin conceded on November 8. Carnahan unsuccessfully sought re-election in 2012. The same year Martin unsuccessfully ran for Missouri Attorney General.

 Democratic primary results 

 
 
 

Republican primary results

 
 
 
 
 

General election results

 
 
 
 
 
 
 

External links
 
 
 
 

District 4

 
The 4th district included Sedalia and part of Jefferson City. The district's population was 91 percent white (see Race and ethnicity in the United States Census); 85 percent were high school graduates and 17 percent had received a bachelor's degree or higher. Its median income was $42,317. In the 2008 presidential election the district gave 61 percent of its vote to Republican nominee John McCain and 38 percent to Democratic nominee Barack Obama. In 2010 the district had a Cook Partisan Voting Index of R+14.

Democrat Ike Skelton, who took office in 1977, was the incumbent. Skelton was re-elected in 2008 with 66 percent of the vote. In 2010 Skelton's opponent in the general election was Republican nominee Vicky Hartzler, a former member of the Missouri General Assembly. Constitution Party nominee Greg Cowan and Libertarian Party nominee Jason Michael Braun also ran. Leonard Steinman, a salvage dealer and perennial candidate, also sought the Democratic nomination. Brian Clark; Arthur Madden; Eric McElroy; Jeff Parnell; Brian Riley; James Scholz; Bill Stouffer, a member of the Missouri Senate; and Roy Viessman, a former member of the Jefferson City Council, also sought the Republican nomination. Thomas Holbrook also sought the Libertarian nomination.

Skelton raised $2,923,038 and spent $3,107,552. Hartzler raised $1,373,530 and spent $1,351,176. Cowan raised $1,369 and spent $2,320. Madden raised $19,596 and spent the same amount. Riley raised $44,655 and spent $44,654. Scholz raised $31,208 and spent $31,081. Stouffer raised $464,174 and spent $460,777.

In a poll of 1,207 registered voters, conducted by We Ask America on August 17, 2010, Skelton led with 45 percent to Hartzler's 42 percent, while 13 percent were undecided. A poll of 187 registered voters, conducted by KY3 and Missouri State University (MSU) between August 7 and 22, 2010, found 47 percent supported Skelton while 35 percent favored Hartzler and 2 percent were undecided. In a poll of 300 likely voters, conducted in October 2010 by Wilson Research Strategies, Hartzler and Skelton were tied with 42 percent apiece. A poll of 159 likely voters, conducted by MSU's Center for Social Sciences and Policy Research between October 20 and 27, 2010, found Skelton led with 46 percent to Hartzler's 39 percent, while 14 percent were undecided and 2 percent supported other candidates.

Sabato's Crystal Ball rated the race as "Leans Democratic". In October 2010 The Cook Political Report rated the race as a "toss up" and CQ Politics rated the race as a "tossup". In November 2010 The Rothenberg Political Report rated the race as a "pure toss-up". Prior to the election, ''FiveThirtyEights forecast gave Hartzler a 52 percent chance of winning and projected that she would receive 50 percent of the vote to Skelton's 48 percent.

On election day Hartzler was elected with 50 percent of the vote to Skelton's 45 percent. Hartzler was re-elected in 2012 and 2014. Skelton died in October 2013.

Democratic primary results

 
 
 
 

Republican primary results

 
 
 
 
 
 
 
 
 
 
 

Libertarian primary results

 
 
 
 

General election results

 
 
 
 
 
 

 External links 
 
 
 
 
 

District 5

The 5th district included Belton, Grandview, Raytown, and parts of Independence, Kansas City and Lee's Summit. The district's population was 64 percent white, 24 percent black and 8 percent Hispanic (see Race and ethnicity in the United States Census); 87 percent were high school graduates and 26 percent had received a bachelor's degree or higher. Its median income was $45,213. In the 2008 presidential election the district gave 63 percent of its vote to Democratic nominee Barack Obama and 36 percent to Republican nominee John McCain.

Democrat Emanuel Cleaver, who took office in 2005, was the incumbent. Cleaver was re-elected in 2008 with 64 percent of the vote. In 2010 Cleaver's opponent in the general election was Republican nominee Jacob Turk, who also ran in 2006 and 2008. Constitution Party nominee Dave Lay and Libertarian Party nominee Randall D. Langkraehr also ran. Jerry Fowler; Patrick Haake; Ron Shawd, a former car dealer; and Ralph Sheffield also sought the Republican nomination. Cleaver was unopposed for the Democratic nomination.

Cleaver raised $637,380 and spent $607,575. Turk raised $274,423 and spent $258,627. In a poll of 500 likely voters, conducted by Pulse Opinion Research (a service run by Rasmussen Reports), found 52 percent supported Cleaver while 43 percent backed Turk. FiveThirtyEights forecast gave Cleaver a 100 percent chance of winning and projected that he would receive 59 percent of the vote to Turk's 39 percent. On election day Cleaver was re-elected with 53 percent of the vote to Turk's 44 percent. Cleaver was re-elected, again over Turk, in 2012 and 2014.

Republican primary results

 
 
 
 
 
 
 

General election results

 
 
 
 
 
 

External links
 
 
 

District 6

The 6th district included St. Joseph and parts of Blue Springs and Kansas City. The district's population was 90 percent white (see Race and ethnicity in the United States Census); 89 percent were high school graduates and 25 percent had received a bachelor's degree or higher. Its median income was $51,899. In the 2008 presidential election the district gave 54 percent of its vote to Republican nominee John McCain and 45 percent to Democratic nominee Barack Obama.

Republican Sam Graves, who took office in 2001, was the incumbent. In 2010 Graves's opponent in the general election was Democratic nominee Clint Hylton, an insurance salesman. Write-in candidate Kyle Yarber also ran. Christopher Ryan also sought the Republican nomination. Hylton was unopposed for the Democratic nomination.

Graves raised $1,057,245 and spent $1,071,726. Hylton raised $9,461 and spent $9,394. Yarber raised $16,602 and spent $16,601.

Prior to the election FiveThirtyEights forecast gave Graves a 100 percent chance of winning and projected that he would receive 66 percent of the vote to Hylton's 31 percent. On election day Graves was re-elected with 69 percent of the vote to Hylton's 31 percent. Graves was again re-elected in 2012 and 2014.

Republican primary results

 
 
 
 

General election results

 
 
 
 
 

External links
 
 

District 7

The 7th district included Joplin and Springfield. The district's population was 90 percent white (see Race and ethnicity in the United States Census); 85 percent were high school graduates and 22 percent had received a bachelor's degree or higher. Its median income was $41,452. In the 2008 presidential election, the district gave 63 percent of its vote to Republican nominee John McCain and 35 percent to Democratic nominee Barack Obama.

Republican Roy Blunt, who took office in 1997, was the incumbent. Blunt, the father of Governor Matt Blunt, was re-elected in 2008 with 68 percent of the vote. In 2010 he ran for the U.S. Senate rather than seeking re-election.

The candidates in the general election were Republican nominee Billy Long, an auctioneer; and Democratic nominee Scott Eckersley, an attorney who previously worked for Governor Blunt. Libertarian Party nominee Kevin Craig and write-in candidate Nicholas Ladendorf also ran.

Jack Goodman, a member of the Missouri Senate; Steve Hunter, a former member of the Missouri House of Representatives; Mike Moon, a farmer; Darrell Moore, the Greene County prosecuting attorney; Gary Nodler, a member of the Missouri Senate; Michael Wardell, a small business owner; and Jeff Wisdom, an Iraq War veteran, also sought the Republican nomination. Sarah Steelman, the former State Treasurer of Missouri, announced in September 2009 that she would not run in the 7th district in 2010. Tim Davis, an attorney, also sought the Democratic nomination.

Long raised $1,260,007 and spent $1,230,604. Eckersley raised $186,310 and spent the same amount. Goodman raised $482,233 and spent $478,534. Moon raised $25,279 and spent $25,278. Moore raised $45,424 and spent $44,977. Nodler raised $383,130 and spent $380,240. Wisdom raised $20,101 and spent $20,080. Davis raised $24,119 and spent $22,928.

In a poll of 198 registered voters, conducted by KY3 and Missouri State University (MSU) between August 7 and August 22, 2010, Long led with 51 percent to Eckersley's 23 percent. A poll of 199 likely voters, conducted by MSU's Center for Social Sciences and Public olicy Research between October 20 and 27, 2010, found Long leading with 56 percent to Eckersley's 23 percent while 7 percent supported Craig, 1 percent favored other candidates, and 13 percent were undecided. Prior to the election FiveThirtyEights forecast gave Long a 100 percent chance of winning and projected that he would receive 69 percent of the vote to Eckersley's 28 percent. Eckersley increased his share of the voting to more than 30 percent, but Long was elected with 63 percent of the vote. Long was re-elected in 2012 and 2014.

On October 29, 2010, an email was sent to local media, purportedly by Eckersley, which falsely claimed that he had ended his campaign. At least one television station inaccurately reported the story as fact. Eckersley later filed a complaint with the Federal Elections Commission (FEC) alleging that Long may have been involved in the hoax. The FEC investigated and reported in 2013 that the emails had come from Patrick Binning, a political consultant, and that Binning had acted independently of Long's campaign. As the FEC found no evidence that Long's campaign or the Republican Party was involved, under the law electoral fraud had not occurred.

Republican primary results

 
 
 
 
 
 
 
 
 
 

Democratic primary results

 
 
 
 

General election results

 
 
 
 
 
 

External links
 
 
 
 
 
 
 
 

District 8

The 8th district included Cape Girardeau, Poplar Bluff and Rolla. The district's population was 91 percent white and 5 percent black (see Race and ethnicity in the United States Census); 77 percent were high school graduates and 14 percent had received a bachelor's degree or higher. Its median income was $34,454. In the 2008 presidential election the district gave 62 percent of its vote to Republican nominee John McCain and 36 percent to Democratic nominee Barack Obama.

Republican Jo Ann Emerson, who took office in 1996, was the incumbent. Emerson was re-elected with 71 percent of the vote in 2008. Emerson announced in January 2009 that she would not run for the U.S. Senate in 2010. In 2010 Emerson's opponent in the general election was Democratic nominee Tommy Sowers, a former member of the United States Army Special Forces. Independent candidate Larry Bill, a real estate investor and building contractor; and Libertarian Party nominee Rick Vandeven, a technician with Procter & Gamble, also ran. Bob Parker, a farmer, also sought the Republican nomination. Sowers was unopposed for the Democratic nomination.

Emerson raised $2,006,543 and spent $2,071,160. Sowers raised $1,588,389 and spent $1,572,930. Bill raised $15,630 and spent the same amount. Parker raised $38,565 and spent $37,472.

In a poll of 400 likely voters, conducted on April 19 and 20, 2010, by American Viewpoint (AV) for Emerson's campaign, Emerson led with 71 percent to Sowers's 18 percent. A poll of 171 registered voters, conducted by KY3 and Missouri State University between August 7 and 22, 2010, found Emerson leading with 64 percent to Sowers's 17 percent while 3 percent supported other candidates. An AV poll of 400 likely voters, conducted on September 13 and 14, 2010, found Emerson had the support of 63 percent while 24 percent backed Sowers.

Prior to the election FiveThirtyEight'''s forecast gave Emerson a 100 percent chance of winning and projected that she would receive 68 percent of the vote to Sowers's 29 percent. On election day Emerson was re-elected with 66 percent of the vote to Sowers's 29 percent. Emerson was again re-elected in 2012 and resigned from Congress in January 2013. She was succeeded by Jason T. Smith. In August 2012 Sowers was confirmed as Assistant Secretary for Public and Intergovernmental Affairs at the Department of Veterans Affairs.

Republican primary results

 
 
 
 

General election results

 
 
 
 
 
 

External links
 
 
 

District 9

The 9th district included Columbia, Hannibal and Kirksville. The district's population was 92 percent white (see Race and ethnicity in the United States Census); 86 percent were high school graduates and 23 percent had received a bachelor's degree or higher. Its median income was $44,118. In the 2008 presidential election the district gave 55 percent of its vote to Republican nominee John McCain and 44 percent to Democratic nominee Barack Obama.

Republican Blaine Luetkemeyer, who took office in 2009, was the incumbent. Luetkemeyer was elected with 50 percent of the vote in 2008. In 2010 Luetkemeyer's opponent in the general election was Libertarian Party nominee Christopher Dwyer. The 2010 election in the 9th district marked the first time since 1984 that a U.S. Representative from Missouri ran unopposed in the general election. Ron Burrus and Jeff Reed also ran as write-in candidates. James O. Baker also sought the Republican nomination. Steven Wilson also sought the Libertarian nomination.

Luetkemeyer raised $1,358,842 and spent $737,857. Prior to the election FiveThirtyEights forecast gave Luetkemeyer a 100 percent chance of winning. On election day Luetkemeyer was re-elected with 77 percent of the vote to Dwyer's 22 percent. Luetkemeyer was again re-elected in 2012 and 2014.

Republican primary results

Libertarian primary results

General election results

External links

See also
 List of United States representatives from Missouri
 United States congressional delegations from Missouri

References

Missouri
2010
United States House